Digita is a genus of moths of the family Erebidae erected by Michael Fibiger in 2008.

Species
Digita biuncus Fibiger, 2008
Digita ampullai Fibiger, 2008

References

Micronoctuini
Noctuoidea genera